is a city located in Niigata Prefecture, Japan. , the city had an estimated population of 34,704 in 12,758 households, and a population density of 224 persons per km².

Geography
Ojiya is located in an inland region of central Niigata Prefecture at the southern end of the Echigo Plain. The Shinano River flows through the city. The area has very heavy snow in winter.

Surrounding municipalities
Niigata Prefecture
Nagaoka
Uonuma
Tokamachi

Climate
Ojiya has a Humid climate (Köppen Cfa) characterized by warm, wet summers and cold winters with heavy snowfall.  The average annual temperature in Ojiya is 12.6 °C. The average annual rainfall is 2263 mm with September as the wettest month. The temperatures are highest on average in August, at around 25.8 °C, and lowest in January, at around 0.5 °C.

Demographics
Per Japanese census data, the population of Ojiya has declined over the past 40 years.

Government

Ojiya has a mayor-council form of government with a directly elected mayor and a unicameral city legislature of 16 members.

Economy
Ojiya is known as the birthplace of Nishikigoi carps, along with Yamakoshi.

Transportation

Railway
 JR East - Jōetsu Line
  
 JR East - Iiyama Line
  -

Highway
  Kan-Etsu Expressway – Ojiya IC

Notable people from Ojiya 
 Uchiyama Gudō, Zen priest and anarcho-socialist activist
Junzaburō Nishiwaki, poet

References

External links

Official Website 

 
Cities in Niigata Prefecture